Auto alley may refer to:
 Auto row, a local cluster of automobile retailers
 Auto Alley, an area of more concentrated automobile manufacturing mostly in Ontario, the midwestern United States, and central Mexico